Nortal is a multinational strategic change and technology company headquartered in Tallinn, Estonia, with operations in the US, Europe, the Middle East and Africa.

Nortal provides public sector and private sector clients data-driven business transformation. Most notably a large part of the digitalization of Estonia's governmental e-services has been planned and implemented by Nortal and its Estonian predecessor Webmedia. Nortal is a keen promoter of good governance through e-government focusing on removing obstacles of human development, reducing hidden transaction costs in societies, increasing transparency of administration, reducing waste and increasing overall procedural efficiency.

History

2000 – Nortal was established under the name Webmedia in Tartu, Estonia.

2004 – Webmedia was ranked first in the Estonian IT-companies TOP, published by Bonnier Group business newspaper Äripäev.

2006 – Webmedia expanded operations to Lithuania, Romania and Serbia, doubling the number of employees from 62 to 126.

2008 – Webmedia opened a branch office operates in Qatar. In July 2009, Webmedia Group signed a contract to participate in the development of Qatar's e-state.

2008 – Deloitte & Touché ranked Webmedia among the 30 fastest-growing companies in Central and Eastern Europe, and among the 500 fastest-growing technology companies in the EMEA region.

2010 – Webmedia acquired the healthcare unit of Cybernetica AS, adding laboratory information system to eHealth product line.

2011 – Webmedia Group AS acquired Finnish CCC Corporation Oy, a systems' development partner for telecommunication, shipping and industrial companies, resulting in the largest software development company in the Baltics.  They rebranded into Nortal.

2012 – Nortal helped create the electronic financial management platform GIFMIS (Government Integrated Financial Management and Information System) for the federal government of Nigeria, an integral part of the Treasury Single Account (TSA) financial policy. It goes on to save N153 billion and uncover about 46,000 ghost workers by 2013.

2012 – Nortal was the IT-partner for the first Estonian e-census, breaking the world record – 66% of the population participated in the census over the internet.

2013 – Nortal started developing Oman's Invest Easy portal, which has received high critical acclaim as one of the best Government to Business portals in the world.

2013 – Nortal and Fast Enterprises won €226 million tender to supply the Finnish Tax Administration with a new tax system.

2014 – Nortal received an award for the most employee and family friendly company in Estonia for the third time.

2016 – Nortal creates a government e-services portal for the Sultanate of Oman. The Invest Easy portal allows Omani entrepreneurs to register a company in 1 minute 50 seconds. Oman rose 127 places in the World Bank's  Ease of Doing Business index ranking as a result.

2016 – Nortal acquired marketing automation and lead management company Element, based in Stockholm, Sweden.

2016 – Nortal Group shareholders bought back 50% of Group shares from Enterprise Investors and LHV Pension Funds, regaining full ownership of the company.

2017 – Nortal issued bonds for 15 million euros to boost expansion.

2018 – Nortal opens an office in Düsseldorf, Germany.

2018 – Nortal acquires U.S. Company Dev9  expanding its North American footprint.

2020 – Nortal announced selling off its marketing automation division in Sweden via a management buyout.

2020 – Nortal acquired Schütze AG, a leading strategic consulting and software engineering company in Germany. The merge strengthened Nortal’s expansion strategy in Europe, creating a transatlantic digital transformation powerhouse of 1000 experts.

Over the years Nortal has been the start for several spin-off businesses, which continue to operate as separate companies – ZeroTurnaround, Plumbr, eInvoices Centre, OpenText ECM and Leanest Ltd.

One of the founding members, Taavi Kotka left Nortal in 2012 to become the first Chief Information Officer of the Estonian government and one of the founders of the e-Residency program.

Areas of expertise 
Since the foundation of the company, Nortal's solutions have been implemented in 60 countries across five continents. Nortal has received significant critical acclaim for many of its solutions. Most notably a third of all e-government solutions in Estonia  have been planned and implemented by Nortal, for example operative system of European Union structural funds for Estonian Ministry of Finance, employment information system for Estonian Unemployment Insurance Fund, launching proactive family and parental benefits for Social Insurance Board etc.

Among some of its most noteworthy projects are also the electronic financial management platform GIFMIS for the federal government of Nigeria, e-tax system for Botswana Unified Revenue Service (BURS) and Invest Easy, major government e-services portal for the Sultanate of Oman. 
Invest Easy is widely acknowledged and awarded EODB (ease of doing business) project that has had substantial impact on local business environment and climate in Oman. Following successful launch and implementation of Invest Easy portal, Oman made an unprecedented leap in the Ease of Doing Business Ranking of World Bank's annual Doing Business 2017 report, jumping 127 places in category ’Starting a Business’ compared to previous year.
Invest Easy has also been awarded: H H Sheikh Salem al Ali al Sabah Informatics Award 2016 in the Government category; Al Roya Economic Award for Best Government to Business e-service; GCC e-Government Award for Best Government to Business e-service etc. UNCTAD (GER.co rating
) rated Invest Easy portal in Oman with a perfect score of 10/10, naming it one of the five best government-to-business (G2B) solutions in the world

Among other examples, in Germany the company launched an award-winning pilot to manage digital prescriptions, paired with medical video consultations in the federal state of Hessen, together with Optica and other partners.

Operations 
Since the founding of the company in 2000, Nortal's solutions have been implemented in 60 countries across five continents. Nortal has eight home markets – Estonia, Finland, Lithuania, Oman, UAE, Germany, United States and Serbia.

Social Responsibility 

To promote learning and innovation, software development and IT-analysis, Nortal has launched cooperation initiatives with universities in Tartu and Tallinn, where Nortal's senior specialists run educational courses on a regular basis.

Nortal supports mathematics and science education both through participating in the organization of science and mathematics competitions in Estonian secondary schools as well as by providing awards.

Nortal contributes to the development of the Estonian ICT sector by providing know-how, consultations and financial support to Estonian start-ups through strategic partnerships with EstBAN, the Estonian Business Angel Network.

Nortal was awarded the Silver Level in 2015, 2016 and 2017 by EcoVadis.

People 
The company has been owned entirely by employees since 2016. The chairman of the board of Nortal is Priit Alamäe. The management board members include  Andre Krull, Jaanus Erlemann and Neringa Narbutiene.

References

External links
 Official website
 

Software companies of Estonia
Software companies established in 2000
2000 establishments in Estonia
Estonian brands
Information technology companies of Estonia
International consulting firms